The 2019 Pennsylvania elections was held on November 5, 2019 to fill judicial positions on the Superior Court, allow judicial retention votes, and fill numerous county, local and municipal offices, the most prominent being the Mayor of Philadelphia. The necessary primary elections were held in May 2019. In addition, special elections for legislative vacancies were held at various times in 2019.

Special Elections

U.S. House of Representatives

12th congressional district 

A special election for Pennsylvania's 12th congressional district was held on May 21, 2019 following the resignation of Republican Representative  Tom Marino.

Pennsylvania State Senate

33rd senatorial district 
A special election for the 33rd senatorial district was held on May 21 following Republican State Senator Richard Alloway's resignation from the chamber.

Democrats selected Spring Grove director of community development Sarah Hammond as their nominee. Republicans nominated retired Army colonel Doug Mastriano.

37th senatorial district 
A special election for the 37th senatorial district was called for April 2, 2019 following Republican State Senator Guy Reschenthaler's election to the United States House of Representatives.

Democrats selected Pam Iovino as their nominee, and Republicans nominated D. Raja.

41st senatorial district 
A special election for the 41st senatorial district was held on May 21 following Republican State Senator Don White's retirement from the chamber.

Democrats selected Indiana University of Pennsylvania professor Susan Boser as their nominee. Republicans nominated White's chief of staff Joe Pittman.

Pennsylvania House of Representatives

11th legislative district 
State Representative Brian Ellis resigned in March 2019 in the midst of a sexual assault investigation. A special election for the 11th legislative district was held on May 21 (alongside the 2019 primary) to fill Ellis' vacancy.

Democrats selected steelworker Sam Doctor as their nominee, and Republicans nominated Marci Mustello, a scheduler for Congressman Mike Kelly.

85th legislative district 
A special election for the 85th legislative district was held on August 20 following Republican State Representative Fred Keller's election to the United States House of Representatives.

Democrats selected physician and school board director Dr. Jennifer Rager-Kay as their nominee, and Republicans nominated David Rowe, vice chair of the East Buffalo Township board of supervisors.

114th legislative district 
State Representative Sid Michaels Kavulich died in October 2018, but was still re-elected in the 2018 elections. A special election for the 114th legislative district was held on March 12, 2019 to fill Kavulich's vacancy.

Democrats selected Bridget Malloy Kosierowski as their nominee, and Republicans nominated Frank Scavo.

190th legislative district 
State Representative Vanessa Lowery Brown was re-elected in the 2018 elections, but resigned in December 2018 after being convicted of bribery. A special election for the 190th legislative district was held on March 12, 2019 to fill Brown's vacancy.

Democrats selected Movita Johnson-Harrell as their nominee, and Republicans nominated Michael Harvey. Two additional candidates, Amen Brown and Pam Williams, ran as independents.

Judge of the Superior Court 

2 vacancies

Primary election

General election

Judicial Retention

Judge of the Superior Court

Judge of the Commonwealth Court

Municipal Elections

Philadelphia

Mayor

City Council

Ballot Questions 
There were no statewide ballot measures up for election in the 2019 general election. however, there were local ballot measures in Allegheny and Philadelphia counties.

References 

November 2019 events in the United States
Pennsylvania special elections
 
Pennsylvania judicial elections
Pennsylvania